A list of men and women international rugby league matches played throughout 2019 and does not include wheelchair rugby league international matches. A † denotes a recognised, but unofficial match that did not contribute to the RLIF World Rankings.

Rankings

March

May

European Championship C

Italy women in Turkey

June

World Cup qualification – Repechage

Oceania Cup

Group A

Group B

Fiji vs Lebanon men in Australia

Notes:
 This fixture was initially announced as Fiji vs Cook Islands, though the Cook Islands withdrew to play their already planned World Cup qualifying fixture against South Africa.
 Isaac Lumelume, D'Rhys Miller, Mikaele Ravalawa, Maika Sivo, Penioni Tagituimua, Brandon Wakeham (all Fiji), Jalal Bazzaz, Jayden El-Jalkh, Kayne Kalache, Jacob Kiraz, Allan Lockwood, James Roumanos, and Elie El-Zakhem (all Lebanon) made their Test debuts.

Samoa women in New Zealand

Fiji vs Papua New Guinea women in Australia

Serbia women in Italy

United States men in Jamaica

July

Colombia vs India men in Australia

August

Serbia men in Czech Republic

Notes:
 This fixture was initially announced as Czech Republic vs Netherlands.

September

Canada women tour of Serbia

Canada men tour of the Balkans

Greece women in Turkey

Greece men in Turkey

Netherlands men in Germany

Peru vs Uruguary men in Australia

Czech Republic women in Poland

October

MEA Championship

France women in Turkey

Italy vs Malta men in Australia

Sweden men in Poland

Philippines vs Italy men in Australia

Norway men in Poland

New Zealand women in Australia

Malta vs Turkey men in Australia

Great Britain Lions tour

World Cup qualifiers - European play-off tournament

Group A

Group B

November

Japan men in Philippines

England women tour of Papua New Guinea

Non-RLIF international matches

Notes:
 This fixture was initially announced as India vs El Salvador, but due to a number of injuries to their squad, El Salvador was required to draft players from Latin Heat Rugby League to fulfil the fixture.

Notes:
 The Western Rams represent the Central West region of New South Wales, with players selected from the Group 10 and Group 11 competitions.

See also
Rugby league nines at the 2019 Pacific Games
2019 Rugby League World Cup 9s

References

2019 in rugby league